Adam Örn Arnarson (born 27 August 1995) is an Icelandic football right back who plays for Leiknir.

Club career
Adam started his career with local club Breiðablik before moving to NEC Nijmegen in the Eredivisie in January 2013. In August 2014 Adam joined Danish Superliga club FC Nordsjælland, managed by compatriot Ólafur Kristjánsson. In November 2014 Adam made his Superliga debut for Nordsjælland in a 1–0 loss to OB.

Adam left Aalesund at the end of the 2018 season. He joined Górnik Zabrze in February 2019. After a spell with Tromsø, Adam rejoined Breiðablik in 2022.

International career
Adam has been involved with the U-17 and U-19 teams, having in total 32 caps for these sides.

References

External links
 
 
 

1995 births
Living people
Adam Orn Arnason
Adam Orn Arnason
Adam Orn Arnason
NEC Nijmegen players
FC Nordsjælland players
Aalesunds FK players
Górnik Zabrze players
Tromsø IL players
Adam Orn Arnason
Ekstraklasa players
Eliteserien players
Norwegian First Division players
Danish Superliga players
Association football defenders
Expatriate footballers in the Netherlands
Expatriate men's footballers in Denmark
Expatriate footballers in Norway
Expatriate footballers in Poland
Adam Orn Arnason
Adam Orn Arnason
Adam Orn Arnason
Adam Orn Arnason